Poecilasthena fragilis is a moth in the family Geometridae. It is found in Australia, including New South Wales, Victoria and Tasmania.

References

Moths described in 1942
Poecilasthena
Moths of Australia